Konrad Eduardovich Wagner (rus. Конрад Эдуардович Вагнер, 17 July 1862, Praszka – after 1948, Kalisz) was a Russian-Polish physician, professor of the University of Kyiv, University of Moscow, Taurida University of Simferopol and University of Warsaw.

He studied medicine at the Imperial Medical Academy in St. Petersburg, graduated in 1886 and received doctor title cum eximia laude in 1889. 1886-1889 he was a resident in the propedeutics clinic, 1889-1891 assistant in Manassein's clinic of internal diseases. He studied abroad under Mechnikov and Roux at Pasteur Institute in Paris, in London, Vienna, Berlin, Leipzig, Strassburg and Prague under Huppert. In years 1891–1897 he was a Privatdozent in Sankt Petersburg, in 1897 he became professor and moved to Kiev, where he headed the diagnostics and therapeutics clinics. 1914-1917 he was professor at Moscow University. In years 1918-1920 professor in Simferopol. In the 1920s Wagner lived in Cairo. In 1931 he moved to Warsaw, where he was appointed professor of internal diseases. After World War II he lived for a short time in Piotrków, than moved to Kalisz, where he died about 1950.

Selected publications
 Материалы по клиническому изучению колебаний в свойствах желудочного сока. Дисс. СПб., 1888
 Contribution à l'étude de l'immunité; le charbon des poules. Ann. de l'Inst. Pasteur 4, pp. 570–602, 1890
 Zur Frage der eosinophilen Leukocytose bei Echinokokkus der inneren Organe. Centralblatt für innere Medizin 29, pp. 129–144, 1908
 К вопросу о сужении и закрытии просвета верхней полой вены, 1914
 Przypadek pierwotnej błonicy palca. Medycyna 5 (23), pp. 785–787, 1931
 Przyczynki do symptomatologii zwężenia i zamknięcia światła górnej żyły głównej. Polska Gazeta Lekarska 11 (4, 5), ss. 61-65, 81-85, 1932
 Wskazania i wartości lecznicze Heluanu (w Egipcie). Medycyna 7 (13), pp. 397–403, 1933
 O czerwonce pełzakowej i jej leczeniu na podstawie spostrzeżeń w Egipcie. Medycyna 9 (18), pp. 597–605, 1935

References

Bibliography
 

Physicians from the Russian Empire
1862 births
1948 deaths
Soviet emigrants to Egypt
Egyptian emigrants to Poland
S.M. Kirov Military Medical Academy alumni
Professorships at the Imperial Moscow University
Expatriates from the Russian Empire in France